Acallistus is a genus of beetles in the family Carabidae, containing the following species:

 Acallistus cuprescens (Sloane, 1920)
 Acallistus longus (Sloane, 1920)
 Acallistus plebius (Sloane, 1920)
 Acallistus tasmanicus (Castelnau, 1867)

References

Broscini
Carabidae genera